Two tickets to India (Dva bileta v Indiu) is a 1985 Soviet/Russian traditionally animated short film directed Roman Kachanov.  It was produced at the Soyuzmultfilm studio in Moscow and is based on the story of the same name by Kir Bulychov. Compared to the book the story was significantly shortened.

Plot
The astronauts from the planet Geda fly to India on a symposium on animal protection of the Galaxy. As a result of a technical malfunction one of them finds himself in a scout's camp situated near Moscow, transformed into a tiger. By means of July and her grandmother, the astronaut manages to reach India.

External links
 
 
 Two tickets to India at the Animator.ru (English and Russian)
 

1985 films
Russian and Soviet animated science fiction films
Films based on works by Kir Bulychov
1980s Russian-language films
Films directed by Roman Abelevich Kachanov
Soyuzmultfilm